Love Is The Message is the second album by Philadelphia International Records houseband MFSB.

Reception

Includes the number one pop, R&B and adult contemporary hit and winner of the 1974 Grammy for Best R&B Instrumental Performance, "TSOP (The Sound of Philadelphia)".  The song was  the theme song for the television show Soul Train.

Late 1970's resurgence

In the transition period between Disco and the up-and-coming Rap movement, the title track, Love Is The Message became a staple at house and block party events in the summers of 1978 and 1979. That track later became the basis for the last Salsoul Orchestra single "Ohh, I Love It (Love Break)", released in 1983.

Track listing

Personnel
MFSB
Bobby Eli, Norman Harris, Reggie Lucas, Roland Chambers, T.J. Tindall - guitar
Anthony Jackson, Ron Baker - bass
Leon Huff, Lenny Pakula, Eddie Green, Harold "Ivory" Williams - keyboards
Earl Young, Karl Chambers, Norman Farrington - drums
Larry Washington - percussion
Vincent Montana, Jr. - vibraphone
Zach Zachery, Tony Williams - saxophone
Don Renaldo and his Strings and Horns
The Three Degrees - vocals

Charts

Singles

Certifications

See also
List of number-one R&B albums of 1974 (U.S.)

References

Further reading

External links
 

1973 albums
MFSB albums
Albums produced by Kenneth Gamble
Albums produced by Leon Huff
Albums arranged by Bobby Martin
Philadelphia International Records albums
Albums recorded at Sigma Sound Studios